Warner Music Philippines (WMP) is a record label in the Philippines. It is a regional branch of the multinational music conglomerate Warner Music Group.

Founded in 1977, the company gained its self-distributed status and has since began releases of several Filipino music artists and bands. The label has been switched to digital-only releases since the 2010s.

History
WMG, then known as WEA International, established WEA Records Philippines under a distribution/license agreement for 15 years with a local group led by Bella Dy Tan.

In 1992, Warner Music officially set up its own local branch, after its distributor gained its own independent status and became Universal Records. Its initial offices were at the Ma. Daniel Building in Malate, Manila.

WMP has been signed artists throughout the 1990s and 2000s, including Lea Salonga, Side A, Alamid, Barbie's Cradle, David Pomeranz, Nina, Kitchie Nadal, Christian Bautista, Sitti, and Kamikazee. In 2003, WMP transferred its offices to the Wynsum Corporate Plaza in Ortigas Center and then to the UnionBank Plaza in the same district.

In the 2010s, amid the widespread of piracy issues, WMP suffered a decline in revenues. Since then, it began transitioned its catalog of releases to digital-only thru global streaming music platforms like Spotify. It also launched its digital site, PressPlay.ph and by that same period, moved its offices to the EcoTower in Bonifacio Global City.

In 2019, WMP signed new artists and bands like Quest, Leanne & Naara, Keiko Necesario and St. Wolf.

In 2020, WMP signed a new partnership with Cagayan de Oro-based 9K Records, a local label featuring artists from southern parts of the Philippines. The same year, WMP also signed an agreement with the PhilPop Fest Foundation and Smart Communications to host the 2020 edition of the annual PhilPop competition.

In 2021, WMG appointed Sarah Ismail as the new Managing Director of WMP. Also in 2021, WMP signed agreement with Sora Music Group, a local EDM label founded by DJ/producer Jenil, as its sublabel.

In October 2021, Warner Music Philippines launched Global Pinoy Music (GLOPM), an initiative movement to expand Filipino music worldwide in collaboration of OPM artists with international-based Filipino artists and producers.

Associated and affiliated labels
 1st.One Entertainment
 9K Records
 Music Colony Records
 Northern Root Records
 Rebel Records PH
 Sora Music Group

Artists

Current
 Felip
 1st.One
 AboutRadio
 Aloura
 Banna Harbera
 Basically Saturday Night
 Boy Graduate
 Carousel Casualties
 Ciudad
 Curse One
 Dave Anonuevo
 Daydream
 Dicta License
 Dilaw
 Hale
 Hulyo
 IV of Spades 
 JRLDM
 Jason Dhakal
 Jikamarie
 Keiko Necesario
 Leanne & Naara
 LNTM
 Lola Amour
 Midnasty
 Muri
 Nicole Laurel Asensio
 Noah Alejandre
 Party Pace
 Paul Pablo
 Quest
 Reon
 St. Wolf
 Sud
 Tonie Enriquez

Sora Music Group
 Eva Smalls
 Ian Sndrz
 Katsy Lee
 LouisVint
 Janny Medina
 Jenil

Previous
 Lea Salonga
 Side A
 Alamid
 Barbie's Cradle
 David Pomeranz
 Nina
 Kitchie Nadal
 Christian Bautista
 Pops Fernandez
 Sitti
 Kamikazee
 Moonstar88
 Gracenote
 Paolo Santos
 Mark Carpio
 Cheese (now Queso)
 Rico Blanco
 Ben&Ben
 Zild Benitez
 Hey June!

References

Philippine record labels
Warner Music labels
Companies based in Bonifacio Global City
Record labels established in 1992
1992 establishments in the Philippines